Carlos Elias Villanueva (born 30 July 1918) was an Argentine equestrian. He competed in two events at the 1952 Summer Olympics.

References

External links
 
 
 

1918 births
Possibly living people
Argentine male equestrians
Olympic equestrians of Argentina
Equestrians at the 1952 Summer Olympics
Sportspeople from Mendoza, Argentina